is a 2 volume shōjo manga by Ryo Ikuemi.

Story
Chiyo Uno has had a crush on Shin Tsubaki since her freshman year. But now that she's in the same class as him, she discovers what a jerk he actually is. Chiyo wishes he would just go away - and her wish is granted: an alien takes over Shin's body. This 'Shin-sama' is the opposite of the owner of the body.

Characters

Chiyo Uno
Chiyo Uno is the 17-year-old girl main character. In the first volume, she states that she has known Shin Tsubaki since her first year (her own nickname for him was 'Shin-sama), but only spoke to him during the second year, when he was put into her class.

Shin Tsubaki
Tsubaki is the class-mate that the main character (Chiyo Uno) has a crush on. He has been described by many people as a womanizer and a player. He hates Chiyo and often calls her 'annoying' and tells her to 'leave him alone', but after Shin-sama takes over his body, Tsubaki begins to treat Chiyo with more respect than when he did at the start.

Shin-sama
Shin-sama (real name unknown) in an alien who, when his spaceship crashes into some mountains somewhere on earth, inhabits the body of a weak old bird, who Chiyo soon accidentally crushes to death. After his first 'vessel' dies, he inhabits the body of 17-year-old Shin Tsubaki, and takes on the nickname Shin-sama from Chiyo Uno.

Kouda
A classmate of Chiyo and Tsubaki. He is in love with Madoka and early on encourages Chiyo to "go for it" with Shin Tsubaki.

Madoka
A schoolmate of Chiyo and the girlfriend of Shin Tsubaki.

Volumes
  published in September 2000
  published in January 2001

External links
 

Shōjo manga
2000 manga